Skulme is a surname. Notable people with the surname include:

Džemma Skulme (1925–2019), Latvian painter
Marta Skulme (1890–1962), Latvian sculptor
Uga Skulme (1895–1963), Latvian painter

Latvian-language surnames
Surnames of Latvian origin